1,4-Dinitrobenzene is an organic compound with the formula C6H4(NO2)2. It is one of three isomers of dinitrobenzene. The 1,4-isomer is most symmetrical.  The compound is a yellow solid that is soluble in organic solvents.  It is prepared from 4-nitroaniline by diazotization followed by treatment with sodium nitrite in the presence of a copper catalyst.

References 

Nitrobenzenes